Steve Morris (born 2 November 1967) is a Scottish retired association football player and coach. Morris spent most of his career with the Milwaukee Wave of the National Professional Soccer League, but he also played in the USISL A-League and the first Major Indoor Soccer League.

Player

Youth
Born in Scotland, Morris moved to Canada with his family before eventually settling in Evanston, Illinois. Morris graduated from Evanston Township High School where he was the 1986 Illinois High School Soccer Player of the Year. In 1997, Evanston Township High School inducted Morris into its Athletic Hall of Fame. In 1986, Morris entered Syracuse University. He was the 1986 Syracuse Orangeman Rookie of the Year, but low grades led to the loss of his athletic eligibility. He enrolled as a part-time student for the 1987–1988 academic year and raised his grades enough to return full-time in the fall of 1988. He rejoined the soccer team and played three consecutive seasons, setting numerous school scoring records. He graduated in 1991. In October 1993, the NCAA stripped Syracuse of all thirty-three victories during Morris' last three season when it was discovered that Syracuse head coach Tim Hankinson had violated NCAA rules by co-signing a loan with Morris.

Morris is one of 22 college players to be part of the 40-40 club, having both 40 goals and 40 assists in their college career.

Professional
In 1991, Morris trained with the Doncaster Rovers in England. He never appears in a league match. Morris then moved to Canada where he played for the Hamilton Steelers of the Canadian Soccer League. That fall, Morris began his extensive indoor career with the Wichita Wings of the Major Indoor Soccer League. On 17 December 1992, Morris signed with the Milwaukee Wave of the National Professional Soccer League. Morris played for the Wave every winter until his retirement in 2001. During those years, the Wave won the 1998, 2000 and 2001 championships. In 2002, the Wave retired Morris' jersey number. In addition to his indoor career, Morris also played for the Chicago Stingers in the 1995 USISL Professional League and the Rockford Raptors. On 5 August 1997, Morris signed with the Milwaukee Rampage of the USISL A-League. Morris won the league title with the Rampage that season.

Coach
In 2003, Morris served as an assistant coach with the Milwaukee Wave United of the USL A-League. That fall, he joined the Milwaukee Wave as an assistant for two seasons. In August 2006, the Chicago Storm hired Morris as head coach.

Morris joined Chicago FC United in 2017 and was the Academy Program Director for the club’s MLS Next program.

Morris joined Bavarian United Soccer Club  in 2022  as the Executive Director.

References

Living people
1967 births
American Indoor Soccer Association players
Dayton Dynamo players
Canadian Soccer League (1987–1992) players
Hamilton Steelers (1981–1992) players
Major Indoor Soccer League (1978–1992) players
Major Indoor Soccer League (2001–2008) coaches
Milwaukee Rampage players
Milwaukee Wave players
National Professional Soccer League (1984–2001) players
Rockford Raptors players
Scottish footballers
Scottish expatriate footballers
Scottish football managers
Scottish expatriate football managers
Syracuse Orange men's soccer players
A-League (1995–2004) players
USL Second Division players
Wichita Wings (MISL) players
Association football forwards
Association football midfielders
Scottish expatriate sportspeople in the United States
Expatriate soccer players in the United States
Scottish expatriate sportspeople in Canada
Expatriate soccer players in Canada
Soccer players from Illinois
Sportspeople from Evanston, Illinois
London Lasers players